Pieter Aldrich and Danie Visser were the defending champions, but Aldrich did not compete this year. Visser teamed up with Gary Muller and lost in the quarterfinals to Nick Brown and Richard Vogel.

Wally Masur and Emilio Sánchez won the title by defeating Omar Camporese and Goran Ivanišević 4–6, 6–3, 6–4 in the final.

Seeds
All seeds received a bye to the second round.

Draw

Finals

Top half

Bottom half

References

External links
 Official results archive (ATP)
 Official results archive (ITF)

Stuttgart Doubles
Doubles 1991